Giuseppe "Pino" Taglialatela (born 2 January 1969) is an Italian former professional football player who played as a goalkeeper. He is club chairman of Lega Pro club Ischia.

Playing career
After developing in the Ischia Isolaverde Youth Sector, Tagliatela transferred to the Napoli Youth Sector, and was promoted to the first team during the 1987–88 season, as the club's third-choice keeper, behind Claudio Garella and Raffaele Di Rusco, failing to make an appearance with the club. Taglialatela began his professional playing career while on loan with Palermo during the 1988–89 season, while they were in Serie C1; after appearing with Avellino in Serie B the following season, he began to gain attention from Serie A clubs.

Taglialatela moved to his native club Napoli in 1990 during their peak, but played in only three games, making his Serie A debut on 6 January 1991, in a 1–0 away defeat to Juventus. After three loan spells at Serie B sides Palermo, Ternana, and Bari, he returned to Napoli, following Giovanni Galli's transfer to Torino, playing with the club from 1993 until 1999. On this occasion, he was finally able to break into the first team, and became the club's number one keeper for several years, as well as the club's captain in 1999, also attracting attention from larger clubs, including Inter, although he elected to remain with Napoli, despite the club's financial crisis. During his third stint with Napoli, he narrowly missed out on the Coppa Italia during the 1996–97 season, as Napoli lost the final to Vicenza. His later seasons with the club were less successful, as Napoli suffered Serie B relegation during the 1997–98 season, conceding numerous goals.

Fiorentina
After leaving Napoli, Taglialatela moved to Fiorentina for 5 billion lire in a co-ownership deal (€2.582 million), where he played as understudy to Francesco Toldo, and later Alexander Manninger. The club also signed Fabio Rossitto for 15 billion lire from Napoli, as well as selling Emiliano Bigica to Napoli.

During his first season with the club, Taglialatela made his UEFA Champions League debut in a 2–0 away defeat to Valencia. In June 2000, Fiorentina signed Taglialatela outright; Bigica also joined Napoli outright.

He won the Coppa Italia during his second season with Fiorentina; his third season in Florence was once again less successful, as Fiorentina were relegated to Serie B.

Siena
Taglialatela subsequently moved to Siena for a season in 2002. After a year-long hiatus, he signed with Serie C1 side Benevento, before ending his career after a season with Avellino, retiring in 2006.

Style of play
Due to his consistent performances, reactions, athleticism, and agility, Taglialatela earned the nicknames "pipistrello" (bat), and "Batman"; he was also known to be a specialist at saving penalty kicks; throughout his career he made 173 appearances in the Italian top–flight between 1991 and 2002, saving 12 penalties from 28 attempts, and he has the highest save percentage from spot kicks in Serie A history (42.9%). He has also stopped the joint–ninth–most penalties in Serie A history, alongside Emiliano Viviano, Luigi Turci, and Massimo Taibi.

Post-playing career
From February to May 2012 he worked as goalkeepers' coach for hometown club Ischia.

In July 2014 he was named new chairman of hometown club Ischia.

Honours
Napoli
Serie A: 1986–87
Coppa Italia: 1986–87
Supercoppa Italiana: 1990

Fiorentina
Coppa Italia: 2000–01

Siena
Serie B: 2002–03

References 

1969 births
Living people
Sportspeople from the Province of Naples
Association football goalkeepers
Italian footballers
Serie A players
Serie B players
Serie C players
A.C.N. Siena 1904 players
S.S.C. Bari players
Benevento Calcio players
ACF Fiorentina players
S.S.C. Napoli players
U.S. Avellino 1912 players
Palermo F.C. players
Footballers from Campania